Leila Al Solh (born 1946) is the vice president of Alwaleed bin Talal Humanitarian Foundation and a former Lebanese minister of industry.

Early life and education
Born in Beirut in 1946, Leila Al Solh is the youngest daughter of the late former Lebanese Prime Minister Riad Al Solh. She is the aunt of Al Waleed bin Talal. She studied at the department of oriental studies of Saint Joseph University, Beirut.

Career
Leila Al Solh served as the minister of industry in the cabinet led by Prime Minister Omar Karami from 2004 to 2005, making her one of the early woman ministers in Lebanon. Al Solh is the vice president of Alwaleed bin Talal Humanitarian Foundation in Lebanon since its establishment in August 2003. Under her management, the foundation realized many activities to support for education, health and social organisations throughout the country.

Political views
Leila Al Solh published an article in the Lebanese daily An Nahar on 20 March 2001, criticising the Syrian government. She argued that Bashar Assad shares his father's (Hafez Assad's) ambition to control Lebanon. She further claimed that the differences between Bashar and Hafez Assad are that Bashar Assad is much more interested in "the investments of Lebanon's tycoons" than the land of Lebanon itself and that he attempts to eliminate foreign criticism by changing the locus of Syrian control from the "army to the [security] agencies." On the other hand, Solh announced her support for the extension of president Emile Lahoud's term in 2004.

Publications
Leila Al Solh published two books on Lebanon as follows:

(2009). Les élections de 2009, les enjeux culturels (The 2009 Elections, Cultural Issues), L’Orient – Le Jour (Special Edition)(2008). Un Liban à retrouver (A Return to Lebanon), L’Orient – Le Jour (Special Edition)

Awards
On 12 March 2008, Leila Al Solh was awarded the Pontifical Medal by Pope Benedict XVI for the efforts of the Alwaleed bin Talal Humanitarian Foundation to encourage religious tolerance.

Al Solh has been regarded as one of the most powerful women in the Middle East. She was named as one of the most powerful three women in 2008. She was considered to be the 4th most powerful woman among 100 Arab women in 2011. In 2012, she was nominated by Arabian Business as the 17th most powerful woman among 100 Arab women. She was named as the world's most influential 39th Arab in 2012 by Arabian Business.

In 2009, Al Solh was awarded with an honorary doctorate from the American University of Science and Technology.

Personal life
Leila Al Solh was married to former Lebanese education minister Majid Hamadeh. She has two daughters and one son. One of her daughters, Haya Majid Hamadeh, graduated from the faculty of medicine at American University of Beirut in 2005.

References

External links

21st-century Lebanese women politicians
21st-century Lebanese politicians
1946 births
Leila Al Solh
Industry ministers of Lebanon
Independent politicians in Lebanon
Lebanese Muslims
Living people
Politicians from Beirut
Saint Joseph University alumni
Women government ministers of Lebanon